Harjot Singh (born 26 January 1994) is an Indian field hockey player who plays as a goalkeeper. He represented India at the 2013 Men's Hockey Junior World Cup and the 2014 Men's Hockey World Cup.

References

External links

1994 births
Living people
People from Fatehgarh Sahib district
Indian male field hockey players
Field hockey players from Punjab, India
2014 Men's Hockey World Cup players